Antonio Osorio y Villegas (also known as Antonio Osorio, Antonio de Osorio y Villegas or Antonio de Villegas y Osorio) was a Spanish nobleman and soldier who served as governor of the Spanish colony of Santo Domingo for two terms, and also as president of the Real Audiencia de Santo Domingo. He was the brother of Governor Diego de Osorio y Villegas, and is most remembered today for having been the executor of the so-called Devastaciones de Osorio in the north and northwest of Hispaniola in the early 1600s.

References

History of the Dominican Republic